Diaosi is a Chinese slang and internet buzzword, often used in a sarcastic and self-deprecating manner, that refers to a young male of mediocre appearance and social standing. Born into a humble family, he has no car, no house, and no connections. Yet as the term went viral on the Internet, Chinese youth (regardless of sex) from all backgrounds began to embrace it. It is slowly transforming into a descriptor of the ordinary Chinese citizen who faces everyday struggles and hardships.

Usage 

The term diaosi (屌丝) – literal meaning "dick hair" – first appeared in an online dispute between two sub-forums of the BBS Baidu Tieba in October 2010. The members of Thunder's Big Three forum were insulted by the term, "diao" (a swear word or an offensive expression for "penis"), so they threw diaosi (dick hair) back at the Li Yi forum, suggesting that Li Yi's membership were inferior. Rather than take offence, Li Yi's membership incorporated the term and identified with it.

The slang term emerged as a comedic insult, similar to the Western equivalent of "living in your mother's basement" – shorthand for "You're brave enough in a web forum but who are you in real life?"  The Japanese term, otaku, also has a lot of similarities with diaosi.

The term became a buzzword, referring to a young man born in a humble family, with mediocre appearance and standing and working in a dead-end job. He has few prospects, is unable to purchase luxuries; he is an outcast from the social mainstream. Their time is mostly spent on the computer, especially online games.  Programmers and media industry workers have the highest percentage of self-identified diaosi.  He also dreams of having a "goddess" as a girlfriend, but when interacting with said "goddess" he feels inferior and behaves awkwardly, knowing the "goddess" would only sleep with an alpha "gaofushuai"(高富帅, "tall, rich and handsome") who is his polar opposite, and the closest distance he would get to intimacy with the "goddess" is that of a dislodged pubic hair neglected alone on the bedsheet during coitus.

Like many insults, an initially vulgar epithet became a self-ascribed identity, in a classic example of a group on the outskirts of society claiming a once derogatory term as their own.  Diaosi has become an almost universal identity among Chinese netizens. A survey conducted by Internet giant Sohu found that 64, 81 and 70 percent of people in their 20s, 30s and 40s, respectively, can identify themselves with the feeling of being a diaosi.  Another report carried out by the Chinese gaming company Giant, in April 2013, says that some 529 million young people (approximately 40 percentage of the total population of China) across the country now embraces the term diaosi.
Although diaosi is often translated as "loser" in English, this is becoming less and less apt, with the growth of diaosi's popularity. Loser remains an indisputably negative term, personal in its injury, while diaosi is a true meme: dynamic, complex, and current, cultural rather than personal.  The ambiguous meaning of diaosi – both as an insult and tribal term – is similar to the American term, redneck, whose poverty and unrefined behavior can not only be a source of pride, but a culture in and of itself.

Social background 

Today, it is common to hear Chinese people proclaim that it's nearly impossible for children from disadvantaged backgrounds to gain entry to the country's upper class. The rate of students of rural background in a renowned university continues to decline. At the same time, the implementation of compulsory education means that more and more youngsters go to college, creating a surplus of educated young men who find it hard to enter the labour market. So not only do physical labourers feel they are marginalised by the society, the young men with a higher education background also feel helpless.

See also 
 Hillbilly
 Otaku
 Redneck
 Yokel
 Incel
 Herbivore men

References 

Chinese culture
Chinese Internet slang
Chinese popular culture
Internet memes
Stereotypes
Chinese youth culture